Quercus look is a species of oak native to the Levant region of Western Asia, including northern Israel, Lebanon, and Syria. Of the local oak species, it prefers to grow at the highest altitudes, for instance at m on Mount Hermon.

Quercus look is placed in subgenus Cerris, section Cerris.

Quercus look is a small-medium deciduous oak, ranging in height from 10-15 m. The leaves are long and shiny, with toothed edges. Leaf sizes range from 5-11 cm. The acorns are large, with a tip that is slightly concave or flat. The acorn's cup covers about two-thirds of the nut.

References

look
Plants described in 1860